The Rothschilds is a 1940 Nazi German historical propaganda film directed by Erich Waschneck.

The film is also known as The Rothschilds' Shares in Waterloo (International recut version, English title). It portrays the role of the Rothschild family in the Napoleonic wars. The Jewish Rothschilds are depicted in a negative manner, consistent with the anti-Semitic policy of Nazi Germany. The 1940 film has a similar title and a similar plot to a 1934 American film, The House of Rothschild, starring George Arliss and Boris Karloff, that presented the Rothschilds in a more positive light. It is one of three Nazi-era German films that provide an antisemitic retelling of an earlier film. The others, both released in 1940, bore titles similar to films released in 1934: The Eternal Jew was a documentary-format film with the same title as the 1934 film and Jud Süss was a drama based on a 1934 film adaptation of a 1925 novel.

Plot summary 
As William I, Elector of Hesse refused to join the French supporting Confederation of the Rhine at its formation in 1806, he is threatened by Napoleon. In Frankfurt, he asks his agent Mayer Amschel Rothschild to convey bonds worth £600,000 he has received from Britain to subsidise his army to safety in England.

Rothschild however uses the money for his own ends, with the help of his sons, Nathan Rothschild in London and James Rothschild in Paris. They first use the money to finance Wellington's army in Spain's war against Napoleon, at advantageous terms of interest. In a notable coup, in 1815, Nathan spreads the rumour that Napoleon had won the Battle of Waterloo, causing London stock prices to collapse. He then bought a large quantity of equities at the bottom of the market, profiting handsomely as prices rose once the truth about the battle emerged. In a decade, the Rothschilds have accumulated a fortune of £11 million by using the Elector's money.

Nathan returns the original capital to the Elector, plus only a small amount of interest, keeping the great bulk of the profits for the Rothschilds, and plans to formalise a Europe wide network of family led financial institutions.

The film ends with a declaration that, as the film is released, the last Rothschild has left continental Europe as a refugee and the next target is England's plutocracy.

Cast 

Erich Ponto as Mayer Amschel Rothschild
Carl Kuhlmann as Nathan Rothschild
Herbert Hübner as Turner
Albert Florath as Baring
Hans Stiebner as Bronstein
Walter Franck as Herries
Waldemar Leitgeb as Wellington
Hans Leibelt as King Louis XVIII
Bernhard Minetti as Fouché
Albert Lippert as James Rothschild
Herbert Wilk as George Crayton
Hilde Weissner as Sylvia Turner
Ludwig Linkmann as Leib Herch
Bruno Hübner as Ruthworth
Rudolf Carl as Rubiner
Michael Bohnen as Prince William IX
Herbert Gernot as Clifford
Theo Shall as Selfridge
Ursula Deinert as Harriet
Hubert von Meyerinck as Baron Vitrolles

Background 

Adolf Hitler believed that film was a potent tool for molding public opinion and the Nazis first established a film department in 1930. Three years later, on their rise to power, Propaganda minister Joseph Goebbels took an interest in using film to promote their philosophy and agenda and insisted that the role of the German cinema was the "vanguard of the Nazi military".

The Nazis had hoped for a surge in antisemitic sentiment after Kristallnacht but, when it became clear that most Germans did not share such views, Goebbels ordered each studio to make an antisemitic film.  While Hitler preferred presenting this agenda directly in films such as Der ewige Jude (The Eternal Jew), Goebbels preferred a more subtle approach of couching such messages in an engaging story with popular appeal.

Saul Friedländer suggests that Goebbels' intent was to counter three films whose messages attacked the persecution of Jews throughout history by producing violently antisemitic versions of those films with identical titles.

References

External links 

 (German dialogue, English subtitles)

1940 films
1940 drama films
1940s historical films
German drama films
German historical films
Films of Nazi Germany
1940s German-language films
Films directed by Erich Waschneck
Nazi antisemitic propaganda films
Films set in the 1800s
Films set in the 1810s
Films set in London
Films set in Germany
Films set in Spain

German black-and-white films
UFA GmbH films
Films set in Frankfurt
Cultural depictions of Arthur Wellesley, 1st Duke of Wellington
Cultural depictions of Louis XVII
Films set in Paris